The Kerry Blue Terrier (also known as the Irish Blue Terrier) is a breed of dog. Originally bred to control vermin including rats, rabbits, badgers, foxes, otters and hares, over time the Kerry became a general working dog used for a variety of jobs including herding cattle and sheep, and as a guard dog. Today the Kerry has spread around the world as a companion and working dog. Despite a Kerry Blue winning Crufts (the most prestigious UK dog show) in 2000, it remains an "unfashionable" breed, and is distinctly uncommon; however, it is not as threatened as some of the other terrier breeds such as the Skye Terrier, Sealyham Terrier, and Dandie Dinmont Terrier.

Description

Appearance

Some characteristics of the Kerry Blue Terrier include a long head, flat skull, deep chest, and a soft wavy-to-curly coat that comes in several shades of "blue", the general term outside this breed being progressive grey. Puppies are born black; the blue appears gradually as the puppy grows older, usually up to 2 years of age.

Coat
The coat is the key feature of the Kerry. It is soft and wavy with no undercoat. The texture feels like a combination of fine human hair and wool.  It does not shed but continues to grow throughout the year. This means the Kerry Blue requires very regular grooming (at least once per week) and clipping an average of every 6 weeks.

Temperament
Kerry Blue Terriers are strong-headed and highly spirited. They have always been loyal and affectionate towards their owners and very gentle towards children but were often considered downright mean toward other animals, including other dogs. If they are socialised with other dogs this is no longer the case. In the early days of competitive dog showing, the Irish Kennel Club required Kerries had to pass a "gameness" test, known as Teastas Mor certification, before they were deemed worthy of being judged. These tests included catching rabbits and bringing a badger to bay in its set.  They are fast, strong, and intelligent, and they do well in obedience, dog agility, sheep herding, and tracking. They have been used as police dogs in Ireland. Modern breeders have attempted to retain high spirits whilst breeding out aggression.

As a long-legged breed, the activity level of the Kerry Blue Terrier ranges from moderate to high. They require an active, skilled owner who can provide them with early socialisation and obedience training. Kerries require daily exercise.

Health

Kerries are fairly healthy, but there are some genetic disorders that are prevalent in the breed. They are prone to eye problems such as keratoconjunctivitis sicca (dry eyes), cataracts, and entropion. They sometimes get cysts or tumorous growths in their skin, but these are rarely malignant. Hip dysplasia, hypothyroidism, and cryptorchidism have also been reported occasionally. Progressive neuronal abiotrophy (PNA) is also seen but rare in the population. This condition is also referred to as cerebellar cortical abiotrophy (CCA) or Cerebellar Abiotrophy (CA). Another skin-related health issue is spiculosis though this has been successfully bred out by some breeders. This is a skin disorder that produces abnormally thick hairs that are also called thorns, spikes, or bristles. A U.S. breed club survey puts the average lifespan at 9 1/2 years. Many live to 13 or 14 years.

History
The first literary reference to probably the Kerry Blue dates to 1847, when the author describes a dog that is bluish slate in colour, marked with darker blotches and patches, and often with black about the legs and muzzle. The Kerry Blue Terrier was first observed in the mountains of Kerry in Ireland, hence the name of the breed.

There is a romantic story of a blue dog swimming ashore from a shipwreck: the coat of this dog was so lovely that it was mated with all the female Wheaten Terriers in Kerry (or in all Ireland, according to some), producing the Kerry Blue. Perhaps this story is not entirely myth, as the Portuguese Water Dog is often suggested as part of the Kerry's makeup. Others suggest the Kerry was produced by the Soft Coated Wheaten Terrier crossed with the Bedlington Terrier with (or without) some Irish Wolfhound or Irish Terrier blood. The extinct Gadhar herding dog is also mentioned as another possible branch of the Kerry's family tree. The breed became very popular as an all-around farm dog in rural Ireland.

National Dog of Ireland 
With the development of dog shows in the late 19th and early 20th centuries, the breed became standardised and "tidied up" for the show ring. The Irish nationalist leader Michael Collins owned a famous Kerry Blue named Convict 224. Collins even made an attempt to have the Kerry Blue adopted as the national dog of Ireland.

The first show of the Dublin Irish Blue Terrier Club took place outside official curfew hours and was entered both by those fighting for and against an Irish republic. The Dublin Irish Blue Terrier Club was so successful it led directly to the foundation of the Irish Kennel Club, and a Kerry Blue was the first dog that club registered.

See also
 Dogs portal
 List of dog breeds

References

External links

Dog breeds originating in Ireland
FCI breeds
Terriers
Vulnerable Native Breeds